The 14723 / 14724 Kalindi Express is an Express train by the Indian Railways that connects  in Uttar Pradesh to  in Haryana. The train running from Bhiwani to Kanpur is numbered 14724 while the train from Kanpur to Bhiwani is numbered 14723.

Accidents

 Kalindi Express had a rail accident on 20 August 1995 when it collided with Purushottam Express near Firozabad at 02:55 am on the Delhi–Kanpur section. This Firozabad rail disaster is considered as the second most deadly rail accident in Indian rail history with 358 people deaths (official list), however local people involved in the rescue operations claim that the death toll is more than that. The first train (Kalindi Express) from Kanpur struck a cow but was unable to proceed as its brakes were damaged. It was then struck from behind at a speed of 100 kmph by the Purushottam Express from Puri. Three carriages of the Kalindi Express were destroyed, the engine and the front two carriages of the Purushottam Express were derailed. Most of the 2,200 passengers aboard the two trains were asleep at the time of the accident.
 On 16 January 2010, three people were killed and 14 injured when Kalindi Express rammed into Kanpur Central-bound Shram Shakti Express near Tundla Junction due to dense fog in the morning.

Route & Halts

Route for 14723 from Kanpur to Bhiwani:

Traction
Before It was hauled by a Jhansi-based WDP-4D diesel locomotive from Bhiwani to Farrukhabad Jn.Kanpur-based WAP-7 Electric locomotive from Farrukhabad Jn. to Kanpur Central. But as full route from kanpur Central to Bhiwani is electrified , so Kalindi express is running with Electric locomotive.

References

http://indiarailinfo.com/train/timetable/kalindi-express-14724-klj-to-cnb/898/2190/452

Trains from Kanpur
Rail transport in Haryana
Named passenger trains of India
Rail transport in Delhi
Express trains in India